Bax may refer to:

Bax, Haute-Garonne, a commune of France in the Haute-Garonne department
Bcl-2-associated X protein

Bax, as a surname, may refer to:
Ad Bax (born 1956), Dutch-American biophysicist
Alessio Bax (born 1977), Italian classical pianist
Arnold Bax (1883–1953), British composer
Bob Bax (c.1936–2000), Australian rugby league footballer and coach
Clifford Bax (1886–1962), British writer, brother of Arnold
Ernest Belfort Bax (1854–1926), British socialist
Etienne Bax (born 1988), Dutch sidecarcross rider
Jean-Sebastien Bax (born 1972), retired French-Mauritian footballer
Jos Bax (1946–2020), Dutch footballer
Kylie Bax (born 1975), New Zealand-born model and actress
Mart Bax (born 1937), Dutch political anthropologist
Martin Bax, British paediatrician and arts magazine editor
Nick Bax (born 1970), British designer
Ernest Belfort Bax (1854-1926), English socialist, philosopher, and historian

BAX may refer to:

Bamum language, a language of Cameroon (SIL code: BAX)
Barnaul Airport, Barnaul, Russia (IATA airport code: 'BAX')
BAX Global, a shipping company formerly known as Burlington Air Express
Baxter International (NYSE stock symbol: BAX)
Huron County Memorial Airport, Bad Axe, Michigan, United States (FAA airport code: BAX)

See also
BA-X, German job market index